Mohamed Rais (born 21 April 1952) is a Moroccan boxer. He competed in the men's bantamweight event at the 1976 Summer Olympics. At the 1976 Summer Olympics, he lost to Charles Mooney of the United States.

References

1952 births
Living people
Moroccan male boxers
Olympic boxers of Morocco
Boxers at the 1976 Summer Olympics
Place of birth missing (living people)
Bantamweight boxers
20th-century Moroccan people